Mërgim Vojvoda (born 1 February 1995) is a Kosovan professional footballer who plays as a right-back for Italian club Torino and the Kosovo national team.

Club career

Early career
Vojvoda is a product of youth team systems of the different Belgian and Dutch sides such as JS Pierreuse, CSJ Grivegnée and MVV Maastricht. In 2011 at the age of 16, he joined with youth team of Standard Liège.

Loan at Sint-Truiden
On 20 August 2014, Vojvoda joined Belgian Second Division side Sint-Truidense, on a season-long loan. On 8 November 2014, he made his debut in a 1–0 away win against Roeselare after coming on as a substitute at 63rd minute in place of Pierre-Baptiste Baherlé.

Loan at Carl Zeiss Jena
On 22 June 2015, Vojvoda joined Regionalliga Nordost side Carl Zeiss Jena, on a season-long loan. One month later, he made his debut in a 3–0 away win against VfB Auerbach after coming on as a substitute at 73rd minute in place of Sören Eismann.

Mouscron
On 25 June 2016, Vojvoda joined Belgian First Division A side Mouscron. As part of the deal, Standard Liège secured a sell-on clause guaranteeing them 25% of the profits of a future transfer. On 30 July 2016, he made his debut as a professional footballer in a 2–1 home defeat against Anderlecht after being named in the starting line-up.

Return to Standard Liège
On 27 May 2019, Vojvoda signed a three-year contract with Belgian First Division A club Standard Liège and received squad number 27. Two years later, he made his debut in a 2–0 away win against Cercle Brugge after being named in the starting line-up.

Torino
On 27 August 2020, Vojvoda signed a four-year contract with Serie A club Torino. Torino reportedly paid a €5.5 million transfer fee. He scored his first goal for the club on 3 May 2021 in a 1 0 home win against Parma.

International career

Albania

Under-21
He expressed his desire to play for Albania at international level. He was invited for the first time by the Albania national under-21 football team coach Skënder Gega for the Friendly match on 6 August 2014 against Qatar in Scotland, but did not appear due to visa problem.

In October 2014, he was included in the list of players which called up by national coach Skënder Gega for the friendly match against Romania U21 on 8 October. In the match against Romania U21, Vojvoda played as a starter and the match finished in the 3–1 loss. Vojvoda was again called up to Albania U21, this time to participate in the international friendly tournament in Dubai, United Arab Emirates on 12–18 November 2014.

On 27 March 2015, Vojvoda received the Albanian citizenship to be eligible for playing with Albania U21 in competitive tournaments.

2017 UEFA European Under-21 Championship
Vojvoda was called up for the 2017 UEFA European Under-21 Championship qualification opening match against Liechtenstein U21 on 28 March 2015. He made his competitive debut for Albania U21 against Liechtenstein U21 on 28 March 2015 playing the full 90-minutes match helping his side to win 2–0.

Kosovo
On 8 September 2016, Vojvoda decided to leave the Albania U21 in order to play for Kosovo in the future. He said that he was open for them and that he was ready to accept if there is an invitation sent to him from the Football Federation of Kosovo, On 7 November 2016, he received the call-up in a match against Turkey. On 10 November 2016, FIFA gave permission for Vojvoda to play for Kosovo. On 11 June 2017, Vojvoda made his debut for Kosovo in a 4–1 2018 FIFA World Cup qualification loss to Turkey.

Personal life 
In November 2020 Vojvoda tested positive for COVID-19.

Career statistics

Club

International

Scores and results list Kosovo's goal tally first, score column indicates score after each Vojvoda goal.

Honours

Club
Sint-Truidense
Belgian Second Division: 2014–15

Carl Zeiss Jena
Verbandspokal: 2015–16

References

External links

1995 births
Living people
Sportspeople from Skenderaj
Association football defenders
Kosovan footballers
Kosovo international footballers
Albanian footballers
Albania under-21 international footballers
Sint-Truidense V.V. players
FC Carl Zeiss Jena players
Royal Excel Mouscron players
Standard Liège players
Torino F.C. players
Belgian Pro League players
Challenger Pro League players
Regionalliga players
Serie A players
Kosovan expatriate footballers
Albanian expatriate footballers
Expatriate footballers in Belgium
Kosovan expatriate sportspeople in Belgium
Albanian expatriate sportspeople in Belgium
Expatriate footballers in Germany
Kosovan expatriate sportspeople in Germany
Albanian expatriate sportspeople in Germany
Expatriate footballers in Italy
Belgian people of Kosovan descent